Vélo Club Sovac was a UCI Continental cycling team based in Algeria. It was founded in 2012.

Team roster

Major wins

2012
Stage 4 Tour du Faso, Hichem Chaabane
Stage 8 Tour du Faso, Fayçal Hamza
Stages 9 & 10 Tour du Faso, Adil Barbari
2013
Overall Tour de Blida, Hichem Chaabane
Stage 3, Hichem Chaabane
 Road Race Championships, Hichem Chaabane
 Time Trial Championships, Adil Barbari
Stages 4 & 8 Tour du Faso, Adil Barbari
2014
Stage 1 Tour d'Algérie, Adil Barbari
Grand Prix d'Oran, Adil Barbari
2015
Overall Tour International de Sétif, Nabil Baz
Stage 1, Nabil Baz
Stage 2 Tour de Constantine, Abderrahmane Mansouri
 Road Race Championships, Abderrahmane Mansouri

References

Cycling teams established in 2012
UCI Continental Teams (Africa)
Cycling teams based in Algeria